Radach is a surname. Notable people with the surname include:

Benji Radach (born 1979), American mixed martial artist 
Helmut Radach (1915–?), German rower

See also
Radack